Parler is a social networking service known for hosting right-wing content.

Parler may also refer to:

Music 
 "Parler à mon père", a 2012 song by Celine Dion
 "Parler tout bas", a 2001 song by Alizée

People 
 Parler family, a family of German architects and sculptors from the 14th century
 Heinrich Parler (c. 1300 – c. 1370), German architect and sculptor
 Peter Parler (1333–1399), son of Heinrich
 Wenzel Parler (1360–1404), son of Peter
 Johann Parler (1359–1400s), son of Peter

Other uses
 6550 Parléř, a minor planet

See also 

 Parlour (disambiguation) 
 Parlay (disambiguation)
 Parle (disambiguation)
 Parley (disambiguation)
 Parly